General elections were held in Saint Kitts and Nevis on 29 November 1993. No party won a majority, and although the Saint Kitts and Nevis Labour Party received the most votes, the People's Action Movement remained in power in a minority cabinet in coalition with Nevis Reformation Party.

Results

References

Saint Kitts
Elections in Saint Kitts and Nevis
1993 in Saint Kitts and Nevis